The International Journal of Medical Informatics is a monthly peer-reviewed medical journal covering health informatics. It was established in 1970 as the International Journal of Bio-Medical Computing, obtaining its current name in 1997. It is published by Elsevier on behalf of both the European Federation for Medical Informatics and the International Medical Informatics Association, and is the official journal of both societies. The editor-in-chief is Heimar de Fátima Marin (Federal University of São Paulo). According to the Journal Citation Reports, the journal has a 2020 impact factor of 4.046.

References

External links

Biomedical informatics journals
Elsevier academic journals
Publications established in 1970
Monthly journals
English-language journals
Academic journals associated with international learned and professional societies of Europe
Academic journals associated with international learned and professional societies